Kuyedinsky District is an administrative district (raion) of Perm Krai, Russia; one of the thirty-three in the krai. Municipally, it is incorporated as Kuyedinsky Municipal District. It is located in the south of the krai and borders with Bardymsky District in the north, Chernushinsky District in east, the Republic of Bashkortostan in the south, the territory of the town of krai significance of Chaykovsky in the west, and with Yelovsky District in the northwest. Its administrative center is the rural locality (a settlement) of Kuyeda. Population:  The population of Kuyeda accounts for 35.4% of the district's total population.

Geography 
The district's landscape is mostly flat with some hills in the north and east. Climate is temperate continental.

History
The district was established on June 10, 1931.

Demographics
Ethnic composition as of the 2002 Census:
Russians: 64.2%
Udmurt people: 17.7%
Tatars: 7.4%
Bashkirs: 6.2%
Chuvash people: 2.8%

Economy
The economy of the district is based on agriculture, oil industry, and food industry.

Notable residents 

Elena and Olesya Nurgalieva (born 1976), identical twin ultramarathon runners

References

Notes

Sources

Districts of Perm Krai
States and territories established in 1931
1931 establishments in the Soviet Union